The United States District Court for the Eastern District of Wisconsin (in case citations, E.D. Wis.) is a federal trial court of limited jurisdiction. The court is under the auspices of the United States Court of Appeals for the Seventh Circuit, although patent claims and claims against the federal government under the Tucker Act are appealed to the United States Court of Appeals for the Federal Circuit. The Eastern District was established on June 30, 1870.

The district's headquarters, central courthouse, and the majority of its offices are located in Milwaukee, Wisconsin, but the northern counties of the district are serviced by a courthouse in Green Bay, Wisconsin. Currently, Judge Pamela Pepper is the district's chief judge. , the United States Attorney for the District is Gregory Haanstad.

Organization of the court 

The United States District Court for the Eastern District of Wisconsin is one of two federal judicial districts in Wisconsin. Court for the Eastern District is held at Green Bay and Milwaukee.

Green Bay Division comprises the following counties: Brown, Calumet, Door, Florence, Forest, Kewaunee, Langlade, Manitowoc, Marinette, Menominee, Oconto, Outagamie, Shawano, Waupaca, Waushara, and Winnebago.

Milwaukee Division comprises the following counties: Dodge, Fond du Lac, Green Lake, Kenosha, Marquette, Milwaukee, Ozaukee, Racine, Sheboygan, Walworth, Washington, and Waukesha.

Current judges 
:

Vacancies and pending nominations

Former judges

Chief judges

Succession of seats

See also 
 Courts of Wisconsin
 List of current United States district judges
 List of United States federal courthouses in Wisconsin

References

External links 
 United States District Court, Eastern District of Wisconsin

Wisconsin law
Wisconsin
Milwaukee
Green Bay, Wisconsin
1870 establishments in Wisconsin
Courthouses in Wisconsin
Courts and tribunals established in 1870